Ivan Mayewski (born 5 May 1988) is a Belarusian footballer who plays as a midfielder for Celje.

Club career
In January 2015, Mayewski joined Polish Ekstraklasa club Zawisza Bydgoszcz.

On 7 July 2015, Mayewski signed for Anzhi Makhachkala on a three-year contract.

On 26 January 2017, Mayewski signed for FC Astana. On 20 December 2019, Mayewski signed a new one-year contract with Astana, with the option of an additional year. On 29 December 2020, Astana confirmed that Mayewski had left the club following the expiration of his contract.

On 13 January 2021, he signed with Russian Premier League club Rotor Volgograd.

On 13 July 2021, Mayewski joined Slovenian PrvaLiga side Celje.

International career
On 27 March 2015, Mayewski made his international debut for Belarus in a 2016 UEFA European Football Championship qualifier against Macedonia.

Career statistics

Club

International

Honours 
Minsk
Belarusian Cup: 2012–13

Astana
Kazakhstan Premier League (3): 2017, 2018, 2019
Kazakhstan Super Cup (3): 2018, 2019, 2020

References

External links 
Profile at FC Minsk website

1988 births
Living people
Sportspeople from Magdeburg
Footballers from Saxony-Anhalt
Belarusian footballers
Association football midfielders
Belarusian expatriate footballers
Expatriate footballers in Poland
Expatriate footballers in Russia
Expatriate footballers in Kazakhstan
Expatriate footballers in Slovenia
Belarusian expatriate sportspeople in Poland
Belarusian expatriate sportspeople in Russia
Belarusian expatriate sportspeople in Kazakhstan
Belarus international footballers
Belarusian Premier League players
Ekstraklasa players
Russian Premier League players
Kazakhstan Premier League players
Slovenian PrvaLiga players
FC Vertikal Kalinkovichi players
FC Partizan Minsk players
FC Minsk players
Zawisza Bydgoszcz players
FC Anzhi Makhachkala players
FC Astana players
FC Rotor Volgograd players
NK Celje players